Magia (English: Magic) is the third studio album by Spanish-German singer-songwriter Álvaro Soler. It was released on 9 July 2021 by Airforce1 Records and Universal Music.

Track listing

Charts

Weekly charts

Year-end charts

Release history

References

2021 albums
Álvaro Soler albums
Spanish-language albums